The following is a list of episodes of the Serbian drama Otpisani.

Lists of drama television series episodes